The New Grove Dictionary of Opera is an encyclopedia of opera, considered to be one of the best general reference sources on the subject. It is the largest work on opera in English, and in its printed form, amounts to 5,448 pages in four volumes.

First published in 1992 by Macmillan Reference, London, it was edited by Stanley Sadie with contributions from over 1,300 scholars. There are 11,000 articles in total, covering over 2,900 composers and 1800 operas. Appendices including an index of role names and an index of incipits of arias, ensembles, and opera pieces.

The dictionary is available online, together with The New Grove Dictionary of Music and Musicians.

References
William Salaman, "Review: The New Grove Dictionary of Opera", British Journal of Music Education (1999), 16: 97-110 Cambridge University Press 
John Simon, "Review: The New Grove Dictionary of Opera, 4 vols.", National Review, April 26, 1993 

Charles Rosen, "Review: The New Grove Dictionary of Opera", The New York Review of Books, Volume 40, Number 8, April 22, 1993 
Bernard Holland, "Grove Opera Dictionary Can Make Experts Of Dilettante and Pro", The New York Times, January 2, 1993

External links
Oxford Music Online

1992 non-fiction books
Encyclopedias of music
Books about opera